Murray Sabrin (born December 21, 1946) is a professor of finance in the Anisfield School of Business at Ramapo College and a perennial candidate for public office in New Jersey.

Family, education, and affiliations
Sabrin was born in Bad Wörishofen, Germany on December 21, 1946. His parents, being of Jewish ancestry, were among the only people in his family to survive the Holocaust. Sabrin has said "during World War Two, my father, a Jewish resistance fighter in Lithuania, fought for his freedom and his life with a gun. I'm alive today because of him." Sabrin arrived in the U.S. with his older brother and parents in August 1949 and became a United States citizen in 1959.

He lived with his wife, Florence, in Fort Lee, New Jersey.
He moved to Florida in 2021.

Sabrin has a Ph.D. in geography from Rutgers University, an M.A. in social studies education from Lehman College and a B.A. in history, geography and social studies education from Hunter College. He has worked in commercial real estate sales and marketing, personal portfolio management, and economic research.

Sabrin is the former executive director of the Center for Business and Public Policy at Ramapo College, and is the author of Tax Free 2000: The Rebirth of American Liberty.

Policy advocacy and opinion writing
Sabrin's articles have appeared in The Record (Hackensack, New Jersey), The Star Ledger, Trenton Times, and Asbury Park Press. His essays have also appeared in Commerce Magazine, Mid-Atlantic Journal of Business, Privatization Review, and LewRockwell.com. Sabrin is a contributing columnist for NJBIZ and writes a column on the economy for START-IT magazine. He is a regular columnist for NJVoices and USADaily.

He is writing a book on politics, the economy and culture titled Velvet Fascism: How the Political Elites Transformed America.

Political career
Sabrin was the 1997 Libertarian Party gubernatorial candidate in New Jersey, and the first third party candidate to receive matching funds and participate in three official debates. He garnered 5% of the vote in the election, and the race went to Christine Todd Whitman. In 2008 Sabrin ran as a candidate for the Republican Party nomination for the United States Senate representing New Jersey, where he faced Republican state Senator Joseph Pennacchio and former Republican Congressman Dick Zimmer. Promoting limited government and noninterventionism, he received endorsements from the Republican Liberty Caucus and U.S. Presidential candidate Ron Paul. He garnered 14% of the vote, behind Zimmer (46%) and Pennacchio (40%). He sought the Republican nomination to the same seat in 2014, but lost to Jeff Bell.

In January 2018, he announced his intention to run for the U.S. Senate again, this time under the New Jersey Libertarian Party.

Political positions

Abortion
Sabrin is anti-abortion. During the 2014 election, he wrote a letter criticizing Senate candidate Brian Goldberg on his pro-choice position.

Foreign policy
Sabrin is an outspoken supporter of a non-interventionist foreign policy.

Bibliography

References

External links
 New Jersey-based regional website
 Murray Sabrin archives at LewRockwell.com
 

1946 births
Living people
20th-century American economists
20th-century American male writers
20th-century American non-fiction writers
21st-century American economists
21st-century American male writers
21st-century American non-fiction writers
American columnists
American male non-fiction writers
American people of German-Jewish descent
American political writers
Candidates in the 2018 United States Senate elections
Economists from New Jersey
Jewish American writers
Libertarian economists
Lehman College alumni
New Jersey Libertarians
New Jersey Republicans
Non-interventionism
People from Fort Lee, New Jersey
Ramapo College faculty
Rutgers University alumni
Writers from New Jersey
21st-century American Jews
Candidates in the 1997 United States elections
Candidates in the 2014 United States elections
Candidates in the 2008 United States elections